The lacustrine vole (Microtus limnophilus) is a species of rodent in the family Cricetidae.
It is found in China and Mongolia.

References

Musser, G. G. and M. D. Carleton. 2005. Superfamily Muroidea. pp. 894–1531 in Mammal Species of the World a Taxonomic and Geographic Reference. D. E. Wilson and D. M. Reeder eds. Johns Hopkins University Press, Baltimore.

Microtus
Mammals described in 1889
Taxonomy articles created by Polbot